Pelecanimorphae is a clade of aequornithean birds that comprises the orders Ciconiiformes, Suliformes and Pelecaniformes. In the past the name has been used as a homonym for Pelecaniformes.

References

Neognathae